The Abgeordnetenhaus of Berlin (House of Deputies) is the state parliament (Landtag) of Berlin, Germany according to the city-state's constitution. In 1993 the parliament moved from Rathaus Schöneberg to its present house on Niederkirchnerstraße in Mitte, which until 1934 was the seat of the Prussian Landtag. The current president of the parliament is Dennis Buchner (SPD).

History

The Abgeordnetenhaus was established by the new constitution of West Berlin in 1951. It replaced the former city legislature called Stadtverordnetenversammlung (city deputies assembly), established by the Prussian Reforms in 1808 and re-established by Allied-initiated state elections of 1946.

Between 1951 and 1990 the Abgeordnetenhaus was a parliament of restricted autonomy, since the Allied Control Council required that all its legislation and its elections, such as those of mayors and the senators (then still elected and not yet appointed by the mayor), be subject to Western Allied confirmation or rejection. After reunification the Abgeordnetenhaus continued to be the parliament of united Berlin.

Elections

The parliament of Berlin is chosen every five years in a general, free, secret and direct ballot according to the principle of proportional representation. It consists of at least 130 representatives, 78 chosen directly in the electoral districts of the Berlin boroughs, and 52 indirectly from land or district lists. If a party wins more constituency seats than its overall share of the vote, the overall size of the Abgeordnetenhaus increases because of these overhang mandates.

The current distribution of seats as of the 2021 election (compared to the 2016 election) is:
 Social Democratic Party (SPD): 36 seats (−2)
 Alliance 90/The Greens: 32 seats (+5)
 Christian Democratic Union (CDU): 30 seats (−1)
 The Left: 24 seats (−3)
 Alternative for Germany (AfD): 13 (−12)
 Free Democratic Party (FDP): 12 (±0)
In 2016, the Pirate Party Berlin lost the 15 seats it won for the first time in the 2011 election due to their failure to cross the 5% election threshold necessary to qualify for representation while the AfD joined the assembly for the first time and the FDP returned following a recovery in voter support.

Functions 

The consideration and passing of legislation is the most important task, including the government budget. In addition, the parliament chooses the Governing Mayor, and checks the city's government, the Senate of Berlin.

Citizens can petition the House of Representatives to debate topics via agenda initiatives.

Presidents

See also
 Timeline of Berlin
 :Category:Members of the Abgeordnetenhaus of Berlin

References

External links
 parlament-berlin official website 

Government of Berlin
Buildings and structures in Berlin
Organisations based in Berlin
Berlin, Abgeordnetenhaus von